Ottumwa Young Women's Christian Association , also known as Your Family Center, is a historic building located in Ottumwa, Iowa, United States. Its significance is related to the local social movement that provided a safe place to live for young women and education programs that encouraged their business and professional
development. The Young Women's Christian Association (YWCA) was established in Ottumwa in 1894 by 64 charter members. They began with opening reading and rest rooms before they opened a boarding house. In 1903 they acquired the former First Baptist Church building for their use. They cooperated with the local Young Men's Christian Association (YMCA) for recreational and camping activities. The YMCA built a new larger facility in 1921 and the YWCA considered buying their old building, but they decided to build their own building instead.

The YWCA hired the Minneapolis architectural firm of Croft & Boerner to design the Renaissance Revival building. It was completed in 1925 by contractor C.W. Ennis. The three-story brick structure features round arch openings on the first floor and windows that diminish in size on the upper floors.  The interior features terrazzo floors and oak woodwork that exhibits an American Craftsman influence. It was listed on the National Register of Historic Places in 2005.

References

Buildings and structures completed in 1925
YWCA buildings
Renaissance Revival architecture in Iowa
Buildings and structures in Ottumwa, Iowa
Clubhouses on the National Register of Historic Places in Iowa
National Register of Historic Places in Wapello County, Iowa
History of women in Iowa